Raw is the fifth and final studio album released by the original line-up of The Alarm. The band split up after the album was released. It was released in 1991 on IRS Records.

The album was released on vinyl LP, cassette and CD. It reached number 33 in the UK Albums Chart, and number 161 in the US Billboard 200.

An extended re-mastered version was released, including extra tracks.

Critical reception
MusicHound Rock: The Essential Album Guide called the album "the result of the dreary business of fulfilling contractual obligations."

Track listing
"Raw" - (Mike Peters, Dave Sharp, Eddie MacDonald, Nigel Twist) - 4:28
"Rockin' in the Free World" - (Neil Young) - 3:59
"God Save Somebody" - (Sharp, Twist) - 4:09
"Moments in Time" - (Peters, MacDonald) - 5:42
"Hell or High Water" - (Peters, MacDonald) - 3:47
"Lead Me Through the Darkness" - (Peters, MacDonald) - 4:34
"The Wind Blows Away My Words" - (Peters, Sharp, MacDonald, Twist) - 4:32
"Let the River Run Its Course" - (Peters, Sharp, MacDonald, Twist) - 3:53
"Save Your Crying" - (Sharp, Twist) - 4:38
"Wonderful World" - (Sharp) - 5:00

Single releases
"Raw" was released before the album, reaching number 51 in the UK Singles Chart. It was the only single to be released off the album

Personnel
The Alarm
Mike Peters - lead vocals, acoustic guitar, harmonica
Dave Sharp - lead guitar, backing vocals, harmonica; lead vocals (tracks 3, 9, 10)
Eddie MacDonald - bass, backing vocals, keyboards
Nigel Twist - drums, backing vocals, percussion

Technical personnel
Rob Storm - engineer, additional keyboards
Mark Pythian - engineer
Ian McFarlane - assistant engineer
Danny Griffiths - additional engineer
Dave Buchanan - additional engineer
Keith Andrew - additional engineer
Keith Hartley - additional engineer

Welsh release
An edition of the album sung in Welsh called Tân was released.

"Y Ffordd (The Road)" - 3:46
"Y Gwynt Sy'n Chwythu 'Ngeiriau" - 4:32
"Eiliadau Fel Hyn" - 5:18
"Rocio Yn Ein Rhyddid (Rocking in the Free World)" - 4:43
"Tân" - 4:33
"Dyfnach Na'r Dyfroedd" - 3:48
"Tywys Fi Drwy'r Tywyllwch" - 4:34
"Fel Mae'r Afon" - 4:30
"Crynu Dan Fy Nhraed" - 4:38
"Nadolig Llawen (Happy Xmas (War Is Over))" - 3:40

Japanese release
A Japanese promotional sample 10-track CD album was issued to radio stations in advance of release. It contained a custom promo stamped disc, stickered picture sleeve complete with lyrics and obi-strip

Remastered release
Released in 2000, the remastered edition featured a revised track listings, B-sides and previously unreleased recordings, new and original artwork, unseen photos, lyrics, 
sleeve notes by Mike Peters and interactive programming information to play the album in its original form.

Track listing:
"The Road" - 3:46
"Rockin' in the Free World" - 4:42
"Raw" - 4:28
"The Wind Blows Away My Words" - 4:31
"Unsafe Building (1990)" - 4:50
"God Save Somebody" - 4:10
"Moments in Time" - 5:43
"Let the River Run Its Course" - 4:29
"Lead Me Through the Darkness" - 4:34
"Hell or High Water" - 3:48
"Wonderful World" - 5:01
"Save Your Crying" - 4:38
"Up for Murder (1990)" - 2:57
"Happy Xmas (War Is Over)" - 3:44
"Walk Forever by My Side" - 4:10

2004 promotional release
EMI, after taking over from IRS, released the complete Alarm back catalogue on CD.

References

1991 albums
I.R.S. Records albums
The Alarm albums